The following television stations operate on virtual channel 59 in the United States:

 K18NB-D in Wray, Colorado
 KFRE-TV in Sanger, California
 KPXC-TV in Denver, Colorado
 W30DN-D in Manteo, North Carolina
 WAOE in Peoria, Illinois
 WCHU-LD in Chicago, Illinois
 WCTX in New Haven, Connecticut
 WDNM-LD in Memphis, Tennessee
 WJEB-TV in Jacksonville, Florida
 WJMB-CD in Butler, Pennsylvania
 WSRG-LD in Scranton, Pennsylvania
 WVNS-TV in Lewisburg, West Virginia
 WXIN in Indianapolis, Indiana

The following stations, which are no longer licensed, formerly operated on virtual channel 59 in the United States:
 WEMW-CD in Greensburg, Pennsylvania
 WEPA-CD in Pittsburgh, Pennsylvania
 WJPW-CD in Weirton, West Virginia
 WPCP-CD in New Castle, Pennsylvania

References

59 virtual